Jász-Nagykun-Szolnok was an administrative county (comitatus) in the Kingdom of Hungary. Its territory, which is now in central Hungary, was slightly smaller than that of present Jász-Nagykun-Szolnok county. The capital of the county was Szolnok.

Geography
Jász-Nagykun-Szolnok county shared borders with the Hungarian counties Pest-Pilis-Solt-Kiskun, Heves, Hajdú, Békés, and Csongrád. The rivers Tisza and Körös flow through the county. Its area was  around 1910.

History
Jász-Nagykun-Szolnok county was formed in 1876 from the territories of the Külső-Szolnok part of Heves-Külső-Szolnok County, the Jászság (Jazygia) and the Nagykunság (great Cumania). After World War II, the territory of the county was modified: the area on the left bank of the Tisza around Tiszafüred was taken from Heves county, and the area around Dévaványa went to Békés county.

The term Jász originates from the Jassic people (cf. Alans) who moved to this area of Hungary from the Pontic steppes sometime in the 13th century.

Demographics

Subdivisions

In the early 20th century, the subdivisions of Jász-Nagykun-Szolnok county were:

Notes

References 

Counties in the Kingdom of Hungary
States and territories established in 1876